Romaine Robert Quinn (born July 30, 1990) is an American Republican politician from Rice Lake, Wisconsin.  He is member of the Wisconsin State Senate, representing the 25th Senate district since January 2023.  He was previously mayor of Rice Lake and served three terms in the Wisconsin State Assembly (2015–2021) representing the 75th Assembly district.

Biography

From Rice Lake, Wisconsin, Quinn graduated from Rice Lake High School and received his bachelor's degree from University of Wisconsin–Green Bay in political science and public leadership. Quinn worked for Viking Coca-Cola. Quinn is a Republican. Quinn served as Mayor of Rice Lake, Wisconsin, becoming the youngest mayor to serve in Rice Lake history. On November 4, 2014, Quinn defeated the incumbent Stephen J. Smith for the Wisconsin State Assembly seat.

In March 2020, Quinn announced he would not run for re-election to the Wisconsin State Assembly.

References

External links
 
 

1990 births
Living people
People from Rice Lake, Wisconsin
University of Wisconsin–Green Bay alumni
Businesspeople from Wisconsin
Mayors of places in Wisconsin
Republican Party members of the Wisconsin State Assembly
Republican Party Wisconsin state senators
21st-century American politicians